5-Bekat is a station of the Tashkent Metro on Chilonzor Line. It is the southern terminus of the line. The station was put into operation on December 26, 2020, as part of the third section of Chilonzor line, between Olmazor and 5-Bekat. The adjacent station is 4-Bekat.

References

Tashkent Metro stations
Railway stations opened in 2020